Matthew Thomas Rush (born 11 March 2001) is an English professional footballer who plays as a forward for Braintree Town.

Career
Rush began his career at local club Wickford Town, before moving to Billericay Town in the summer of 2013. In December 2014, Southend United signed Rush to the youth system at the club. During the second half of the 2018–19 season, Rush signed for Great Wakering Rovers on loan. In August 2019, Rush signed for Isthmian League Premier Division club Harlow Town on loan, scoring eleven goals in 13 games in all competitions during three months at the club. 

On 2 November 2019, Rush made his debut for Southend in a 1–0 loss against Sunderland. 

On 6 January 2021, Rush joined National League South side Tonbridge Angels on a four-week loan deal.

On 11 February 2022, following nine National League appearances for Southend, Rush joined fellow Essex club Chelmsford City on loan. At the end of the 2021–22 season, Rush was released by Southend.

On 25 June 2022, Rush agreed to join fellow Essex-based side, Braintree Town ahead of the 2022–23 campaign following his release from Southend.

Personal life
Rush attended The Bromfords School in Wickford alongside former Southend teammate Charlie Kelman.

Career statistics

References

2001 births
Living people
Association football forwards
English footballers
People from Brentwood, Essex
Southend United F.C. players
Great Wakering Rovers F.C. players
Harlow Town F.C. players
Tonbridge Angels F.C. players
Chelmsford City F.C. players
Braintree Town F.C. players
Isthmian League players
English Football League players
National League (English football) players